Hua Mak Station is an Airport Rail Link (Bangkok) station on Srinagarindra Road above Hua Mak Railway Station. In the future, it can be transferred to MRT (Bangkok) Yellow Line at Phatthanakan MRT station.

Station layout

References

Airport Rail Link (Bangkok) stations